Diego Klattenhoff is a Canadian actor known for his portrayals of Mike Faber in the Showtime series Homeland and as FBI Special Agent Donald Ressler in The Blacklist. He has also appeared as Derek in Whistler, Ivan in Men in Trees as well as having a minor role in Mean Girls as Shane Oman.

Early life
Klattenhoff was born in French River, Nova Scotia, Canada. He moved to Toronto at the age of 19 to pursue an acting career. For a number of years, he worked as a bartender while studying in theater workshops. His father was originally from Germany and settled in Canada before Klattenhoff was born.

Career
Klattenhoff studied with some of Canada's most respected acting coaches, including David Rotenberg, Bruce Clayton and Rae Ellen Bodie. His first notable acting role was in Mean Girls (2004). He followed that with a string of appearances in notable TV shows like Smallville and Stargate SG-1, and films like Lucky Number Slevin (2006). Since 2006, he has been in recurring roles like Young Jacob in CBC Television's At the Hotel, Derek in CTV's Whistler, Ivan Palacinke in ABC's Men in Trees and Mike Callahan in NBC's Mercy.

Klattenhoff appeared in Homeland as Mike Faber, a Marine Captain whose best friend returns to the U.S. after disappearing in Iraq eight years earlier. He and the cast were nominated once for a Screen Actors Guild Award for Best Cast, and twice for a PAAFTJ Television Awards for Best Cast in a Drama Series. He has also guest starred on television series such as Psych, Supernatural, 24, and Falling Skies.

Klattenhoff starred in J. J. Abrams' television film Anatomy of Hope and appeared in the Guillermo del Toro film Pacific Rim (2013) and the sci-fi thriller After Earth (2013). In March 2013, Klattenhoff joined the cast of the NBC thriller The Blacklist, as FBI Special Agent Donald Ressler. The show premiered on September 23, 2013, to 12.6 million viewers.

Filmography

Film

Television

References

External links
 

21st-century Canadian male actors
Male actors from Nova Scotia
Canadian male film actors
Canadian male television actors
Canadian people of German descent
Living people
People from Pictou County
Year of birth missing (living people)